Flavius is a Romanian masculine given name. Notable persons with that name include:

Flavius Băd (born 1983), Romanian football player
Flavius Domide (born 1946), Romanian football player
Flavius Koczi (born 1987), Romanian artistic gymnast
Flavius Moldovan (born 1976), Romanian football player
Flavius Stoican (born 1976), Romanian football manager

See also
Operation Flavius, a 1988 British military operation in Gibraltar

Romanian masculine given names